The Women's 5 km freestyle events in cross-country skiing at the 2011 IPC Biathlon and Cross-Country Skiing World Championships, were held on April 3, 2011.

Medals

Results

Sitting

Standing

Visually impaired

References

2011 IPC Biathlon and Cross-Country Skiing World Championships Live results, and schedule at ipclive.siwidata.com
WCH - Khanty Mansiysk - Results - Cross-Country Middle Distance, IPC Nordic Skiing

5 kilometre freestyle